Thousandstar is a novel by Piers Anthony published in 1980.

Plot summary
Thousandstar is a novel in which the main character is an alien blob.

Reception
Dave Langford reviewed Thousandstar for White Dwarf #58, and stated that "pleasant space-opera though a bit long and a bit prone to tell you the moral of each event on the assumption that you're too thick to see it yourself."

Reviews
Review by Tom Easton (1981) in Analog Science Fiction/Science Fact, March 30, 1981

References

1980 novels
American science fiction novels
Avon (publisher) books